Frightwig is an all-female punk rock band from San Francisco, California, formed in 1982 by Deanna Ashley and Mia Levin. After many line-up changes, Frightwig retired in 1994.

Frightwig reformed in 2012 with Rebecca Sevrin and Rachel Thoele. Frightwig's current line-up is Deanna Mitchell, Mia d'Bruzzi, and Eric Drew Feldman. In September, 2014, the band did a US east coast tour with Jane Lee Hooker.

History
Deanna Ashley was raised by a "hippie" mother who introduced her to Buffy Sainte-Marie, Joan Baez, Jimi Hendrix, and the Beatles. When Ashley was 16 years old, she moved to San Francisco. She met Mia Levin at a movie theater in the city. Ashley later described, "It was just one of those magic things when you meet your soul mate. But we also had a lot of angry shows. That’s like a lot of relationships: you get mad at each other, you go through all of everything. And that’s what makes a relationship."

Ashley and Levin, who had grown tired of rock music, formed Frightwig in 1983; the pair went through two drummers prior to the addition of Cecilia Kuhn. The band began playing local shows, eventually earning a record deal with local label Subterranean Records. They received a certain amount of attention for being female, including catcalls that made them feel it necessary to  defend their "right" to be on stage with the men. On "A Man's Gotta Do, What A Man's Gotta Do", Frightwig invited men onto the stage to strip as "a sexist turnaround."

The bandmates worked minimum wage jobs to support themselves. As Ashley recalled, "In the 80s we could work our crappy little jobs and get minimum wage, which was, I remember, $3.25 an hour at the Egyptian and the Strand on Market Street. Our studio was opposite the Sound of Music; we had to carry our equipment at three a.m. downstairs in spiked heel shoes and really blotto drunk."

In San Francisco, Frightwig played the Valencia Tool & Die, The Fillmore, Mabuhay Gardens, the On Broadway, and The Farm. They recorded their debut album Cat Farm Faboo over 72 hours with producers Steve D'Martis and Philip Lithman in 1984. Prior to its release, Susan Miller becaming the band's second guitarist; following the rlease, they toured across the United States and Canada. In 1985, on the eve of a European tour with D.O.A., Levin became pregnant and had to leave the band.

Rebecca Sevrin joined as a guitarist in 1986; that same year, they recorded their second album Faster, Frightwig, Kill! Kill! for Caroline Records. As with their debut, it was recorded in 72 hours and was produced by Eric Drew Feldman. They received attention from a variety of publications, such as Playboy and Spin, and went on another tour of the US. Around this time, Miller also became pregnant and left the band. In 1987, Kuhn also left and was replaced by Robert Castenada, who in turned was replaced by another. In 1989, they recorded the Phone Sexy EP for Boner Records; Lynn Perko, formerly of Sister Double Happiness, filled in on drums and almost joined Frightwig until her band reformed. After another drummer, Ashley and Sevrin decided to disband the group.

In New York City, they often performed at 8BC, which "became one of our homes." The band gained momentary fame after Kurt Cobain was seen at Nirvana's MTV Unplugged concert wearing a Frightwig T-shirt. Frightwig also toured with Flipper, Funkyard, the Butthole Surfers, Snakefinger, GBH, Redd Kross and No Means No, and played with Dead Kennedys, Sonic Youth, Lydia Lunch, L7, SWA and Bikini Kill. Bands and performers who list Frightwig as influential include Hole, L7, Bikini Kill, and Faith No More.

On May 4, 2017, band member Cecilia Kuhn died of cancer. In 2019, Frightwig played a May show at Oasis in San Francisco to benefit RAICES and a September show at PRF West in Oakland, California.

Most recent line-up
Deanna Ashley (Vocals/Bass)
Mia Levin (aka Mia d’Bruzzi) (Vocals/Guitar)
Cecilia Kuhn (1955–2017) (Vocals/Drums)
Eric Drew Feldman (Synthesizer)
Rebecca Sevrin (additional Vocals/Guitar on latest single)

Former members
Rachel Thoele
Susan Miller
Tanya
Paula Frazer
Lynn Perko
Bambi Nonymous
Alistair Shanks
Anne Harney
Robert Castenada
Dana Ross

Discography

Studio albums
 Cat Farm Faboo (1984; Subterranean Records)
 Faster, Frightwig, Kill! Kill! (1986; Caroline Records)

Singles/EPs
 Phonesexy EP (1990; Boner Records)
 Hit Return EP (2013, self-released)
 War On Women 7" Single (2014, self-released)

Compilations
 Teriyaki Asthma Volume III (V/A compilation) (1990; C/Z Records)
 Teriyaki Asthma Volumes I-V (V/A compilation) (1992; C/Z Records)
 Wild Women Never Die... (compilation of first two albums) (1993; Southern Records)

See also
List of all-female bands

References

External links

 
 http://www.mamamiadbruzzi.com

All-female punk bands
Punk rock groups from California
Musical groups from San Francisco
Feminist musicians
Proto-riot grrrl bands
Boner Records artists